In the Light is a double album of contemporary classical music by Keith Jarrett which was recorded and released on the ECM label in April 1974 as ECM 1033/34.

It was Jarrett's fourth release for ECM after Facing You, Ruta and Daitya and Solo Concerts: Bremen/Lausanne and it includes extensive liner notes of his own.

Composition and production 
In 1984, in an interview with Art Lange for DownBeat Jarrett remarked how he conceived these pieces:

In 1974, interviewed by Bob Palmer for DownBeat Jarrett emphasized the production process and how it felt working with Manfred Eicher:

In the lengthy original notes by Keith Jarrett he states that:

Original notes 
From this point on, in the ECM-Jarrett relationship, the austere and minimalist ECM albums' layouts (a label's trademark) would be sometimes filled with Keith Jarrett's notes, poems, philosophical thoughts, quotes or even ruminations and justifications. In the original 1974 ECM LP and CD issues, aside from writing long explanations regarding the individual compositions, Jarrett states:

Reception
The Allmusic review by Richard S. Ginell awarded the album 3 stars, noting, "In this compendium of eight works for all kinds of ensembles, the then 28-year-old Jarrett adamantly refuses to be classified, flitting back and forth through the centuries from the baroque to contemporary dissonance, from exuberant counterpoint for brass quintet to homophonic writing for a string section".

Track listing
All compositions by Keith Jarrett
Disc One
 Metamorphosis - 19:24   Willi Freivogel: flute  String Section of the Südfunk Symphony Orchestra, Stuttgart  conducted by Mladen Gutesha 
 Fughata for Harpsichord - 5:29  Keith Jarrett: piano 
 Brass Quintet - 20:53   The American Brass Quintet

Disc Two  
 A Pagan Hymn - 7:32  Keith Jarrett: piano 
 String Quartet - 16:41   The Fritz Sonnleitner Quartet: Fritz Sonnleitner, Günter Klein, Siegfried Meinecke, Fritza Kiskalt
 Short Piece for Guitar and Strings - 3:56  Ralph Towner: guitarString Section of the Südfunk Symphony Orchestra, Stuttgart conducted by Keith Jarrett
 Crystal Moment - 4:58  Piece for four Celli and two Trombones
 In the Cave, in the Light - 12:18  Keith Jarrett: piano, gong and percussion String Section of the Südfunk Symphony Orchestra, Stuttgart conducted by Keith Jarrett

Personnel
 Keith Jarrett* – Piano, gong, percussion, Conduction, Production
 Willi Freivogel - Flute
 Ralph Towner - Guitar
 The Fritz Sonnleitner Quartet
 The American Brass Quintet
 The Stuttgart Radio Symphony Orchestra (Südfunk Symphony Orchestra)
 Mladen Gutesha  - Conductor
*As stated in the original notes: "Mr. Keith Jarrett plays (of course) PAISTE cymbals and a 38'' Symphony Gong"

Technical Personnel 
 Kurt Rapp, Martin Wieland and M. Scheuermann - Recording Engineers
 R Truckenmüller - Photography
 Georgesyves Braunschweig - Photography
 Barbara and Burkhart Wojirsch - Cover Design and Layout
 Manfred Eicher - Production

References 

ECM Records albums
Keith Jarrett albums
1973 albums